The Attorney General of Washington is the chief legal officer of the U.S. state of Washington and head of the Washington State Office of the Attorney General. The attorney general represents clients of the state and defends the public interest in accordance to state law. The office of the attorney general is an executive office elected by the citizens of Washington, and the officeholder serves a four-year term.

Authority 
The powers and responsibilities of the Washington Attorney General derive from the Washington State Constitution (Const. art. III, § 1) and the Revised Code of Washington (RCW 43.10).

List of attorneys general of Washington 

The following is a list of individuals who have served as attorney general of the U.S. state of Washington. The attorney general is fifth (behind the lieutenant governor, secretary of state, treasurer, and auditor, respectively) in the line of succession to the office of Governor of Washington.

References

External links
 Washington Attorney General official website
 Washington Attorney General articles at ABA Journal
 News and Commentary at FindLaw
 Revised Code of Washington at Law.Justia.com
 U.S. Supreme Court Opinions - "Cases with title containing: State of Washington" at FindLaw
 Washington State Bar Association
 Washington Attorney General Bob Ferguson profile at National Association of Attorneys General
 Press releases at Washington Attorney General

Attorneys General